Erik Gottfrid Christian Brandt (31 August 1884 – 22 October 1955) was a Swedish politician (Social Democratic) and a deputy in the Swedish Parliament in the years 1938–1943.

Brandt came from a southern Swedish pastor's family. After studying at the University of Lund in 1911, he became schoolteacher in Luleå. From 1915, he served as inspector of schools in the province of Dalarna. In 1938, he was elected to the first chamber of the Swedish Parliament, which he belonged until 1943. Brandt got through two deaths and two resignations from party colleagues a promising list place.

Brandt is best known for his failed nomination of Adolf Hitler for the Nobel Peace Prize on the eve of World War II. The nomination was quickly withdrawn as Brandt, who was an antifascist, never intended for it to be a serious proposal and instead saw it only as a "satiric criticism" on another concurrent nomination, namely that of British Prime Minister Neville Chamberlain.

References 

1884 births
1955 deaths
Members of the Riksdag
20th-century Swedish politicians
Swedish anti-fascists